Iris-fixated phakic intraocular lens is an intraocular lens that is implanted surgically into the eye and fixated to the iris to correct myopia (nearsightedness).

Early models were sutured to the iris with a stitch; the claw fixation method made iris stitching unnecessary. The iris-claw lens is fixated to the anterior iris surface by enclavation of a fold of iris tissue into the two diametrically opposed claws of the lens. The fixation sites are located in the midperiphery of the iris, which is immobile during pupillary movement.

This lens was modified into a convex-concave design and manufactured as Artisan/Verisyse lens and later the foldable model (Artiflex), a three-piece lens with silicone optic and PMMA claws, was developed.

See also
 Phakic intraocular lens

References

Corrective lenses